Jay Friedman (born April 11, 1939) is principal trombone for the Chicago Symphony Orchestra. Friedman joined the Chicago Symphony Orchestra in 1962.
When appointed principal in 1964, he was the youngest brass player to take the first chair in a major orchestra.

Friedman has also appeared extensively as a conductor, becoming Music Director of the Symphony of Oak Park & River Forest in 1995, having served as Music Director of the River Cities Philharmonic, and Resident Conductor of the Chicago Chamber Orchestra. He has appeared as guest conductor of the Chicago Symphony Orchestra, the Orchestra of the Italian Radio (RAI), the Malmö Symphony, the Civic Orchestra of Chicago, and the Santa Cecilia Orchestra of Rome.

Friedman has also prepared and published numerous transcriptions of orchestral and classical music for brass ensemble, most frequently trombone choir.

References

2007-04-25; Andries, Dorothy; "Music director to lead Italian orchestra"; River Grove Messenger (pioneerlocal.com) (fee required. Word count: 545).
2006-11-14; Wilkinson, Cathryn; "Friedman finds a home in Oak Park"; Journal of Oak Park and River Forest (wednesdayjournalonline.com).
2004-03-24; Olvera, Jennifer; "Trombonist steps into the spotlight"; River Grove Messenger (pioneerlocal.com) (fee required. Word count: 578).
Phi Beta Mu (Newark, Ohio); The School Musician Director and Teacher; published 1987; Ammark Pub.Co.; p10, 43, 47.  Excerpt:  "Jay Friedman, Chicago first chair, plays and talks about his instrument."

External links
 
 Profile at cso.org
 
Interview with Jay Friedman , March 6, 2001

1939 births
20th-century American male musicians
20th-century classical trombonists
21st-century American male musicians
21st-century classical trombonists
American classical trombonists
Living people
Male trombonists